Mike Campese (born April 2, in Albany, New York) is an American guitarist and composer best known for being a member of the multi-platinum group Trans-Siberian Orchestra. Campese was picked over several guitarists in 2004 during the band's fourth CD, The Lost Christmas Eve, and received a gold record for his work. In 2008 Mike released his own rock Christmas CD, The Meaning of Christmas, which was well received. Campese is an honors graduate from the Musicians Institute in Hollywood, California and is a graduate of Shaker High School.

Biography 
Campese appeared on the Jason Becker tribute CD Warmth In The Wilderness, which was released internationally on the Lion Music record label, and his music was featured in a Lions Gate movie, "Vampire Assassins".
Mike has been featured in national magazines such as Guitar One, Guitar World and Guitar Player and is a columnist for these publications Mike also writes many online guitar columns on sites such as Guitar Nine, Premier Guitar and Shred Academy Campese has done many masterclasses all over the world, in Sept of 2022, the Abbey Road Institute in Paris, hired Mike to do a series of events. Mike has released eleven solo CDs under his name, his second album, Full Circle, was featured on National Public Radio (NPR) stations across the country and was on regular rotation.

Mike continues to tour with his trio and as a solo artist and has opened and performed with many national acts such as The B-52's, the Spin Doctors, KC and The Sunshine Band, Dokken, Sebastian Bach, Lou Reed, Yngwie Malmsteen, Michael Schenker, the members of Yes and Asia, Kip Winger and many more. Campese was a performer at the  Max's Kansas City benefit in 2002 and shared the stage with members of the Bob Dylan band and The Smithereens. Mike performed on the Crüe Fest 2 tour, which featured Mötley Crüe, Godsmack, Drowning Pool, Theory of a Deadman, Rev Theory and more.

Mike's trio was featured on Fox 23, WXXA-TV and Sound Visions which aired across the country. Currently, Mike has been performing at the largest trade show in the world, the winter NAMM Show. In October of 2022, Campese is on the cover and is featured in Italy's premier guitar magazine, Axe Magazine. Campese is a versatile musician, he describes his style as rock fusion and writes vocal and instrumental arrangements, electric and acoustic.

Discography

Solo albums
Total Freedom   digitally remastered  (2001)
Full Circle   (2000)
Vibe             (2003)
The New      (2005)
Hidden Treasures  (2006)
The Meaning of Christmas (2008)
Electric City (2010)
Chameleon (2013)
Chapters (2016)
The Fire Within (2018)
Reset (2022)

Other projects 
Mr Strange  "All This Time"
Mr Strange   "Hey The World"
Jeckyl and Hyde Jeckyl and Hyde

TV and movie 
Fox 23
Soundvisions
Vampire Assassin, Lions Gate  (2005)

Other appearances
Nationwide Compilation by Rodell R  (1995)
Warmth in the Wilderness   Jason Becker Tribute (Lion Music) (2001)
 Marius Danielsen - Legend of Valley Doom part 2 (2018)

References

External links 
Mike Campese's homepage

American male composers
21st-century American composers
Living people
Musicians Institute alumni
Guitarists from New York (state)
Musicians from Albany, New York
American male guitarists
21st-century American male musicians
Year of birth missing (living people)